Kersey is an unincorporated community in Wheatfield Township, Jasper County, Indiana, United States.

A post office was established at Kersey in 1900, and remained in operation until it was discontinued in 1955.

Geography

References

Unincorporated communities in Jasper County, Indiana
Unincorporated communities in Indiana